Baretta is a surname. Notable people with the surname include:

 Angelo Baretta (died 1539), Italian Roman Catholic Bishop of Capri 
 Bill Barretta (born 1964), American puppeteer and producer
 John Baretta (born 1955), former Canadian soccer goalkeeper

See also 

 Baretta (disambiguation)
 Beretta (surname)
 Anthony Vincenzo "Tony" Baretta, fictional detective in the TV series Baretta